Hajj Shahbaz Mahalleh (also Romanized as Ḩājj Shahbāz Maḩalleh; also known as Ḩājjī Shahbāz Maḩalleh) is a village in Asalem Rural District, Asalem District, Talesh County, Gilan Province, Iran. At the 2006 census, its population was 338, in 85 families.

References 

Populated places in Talesh County